The Dhatukatha (dhātukathā) is a Buddhist scripture, part of the Pali Canon of Theravada Buddhism, where it is included in the Abhidhamma Pitaka.

Translation: Discourse on Elements, tr U Narada, 1962, Pali Text Society, Bristol

This book combines ideas from the two preceding abhidhamma books, the Dhammasangani and Vibhanga. It is in the form of questions and answers, grouped into 14 chapters by form. Thus the first chapter asks of each item covered, "In how many aggregates, bases and elements is it included?" Later chapters progress to more complex questions like "From how many aggregates etc. are the dhammas dissociated from the dhammas associated with it dissociated?"

Abhidhamma Pitaka
Theravada Buddhist texts